The European Union's Erasmus Mundus programme (named after Erasmus, the Renaissance scholar) aims to enhance quality in higher education through scholarships and academic co-operation between the EU and the rest of the world. The three main objectives of the programme are linked to the internationalisation of students, staff, curricula and research; ensure an influence on the development of practice in Special Education Needs and inclusive education; and to develop international collaborative networks, projects and research.

Erasmus Mundus comprises three actions:
 Joint programmes
 Partnerships
 Attractiveness projects

Erasmus Mundus Joint Programmes
Under Action 1, Erasmus Mundus supports Joint Programmes (Masters Courses and Joint Doctorates) that are operated by consortia of higher education institutions from the EU and (since 2009) elsewhere in the world. They provide an integrated course and joint or multiple diplomas following study or research at two or more higher education institutions.

Erasmus Mundus funds a number of scholarships for students and academics studying or teaching on Erasmus Mundus Masters Courses. Since 2010, fellowships have also been available for doctoral candidates following one of the Joint doctorates.

Scholarships cover participation costs, subsistence costs, and insurance for the duration of the study period. Many students also have the right to a contribution to travel costs.

Erasmus Mundus partnerships
Under Action 2, Erasmus Mundus Partnerships bring together higher education institutions from Europe and from a particular region in the world. Together, the partnerships manage mobility flows between the two regions for a range of academic levels—undergraduate, masters, doctorate, post-doctorate—and for academic staff.

Scholarships cover participation costs, subsistence costs, insurance for the duration of the study period, plus a contribution to travel costs.

A partnership usually has a legalistic dimension and is based on some formal agreement and close cooperation between two or more parties such as higher education institutions and may involve businesses, non-profit organisations or non-governmental organisations. Partners have specified rights and responsibilities. A collaboration, often described as an ‘authentic partnership’ exists where people identify their common interests and work jointly with others especially in an intellectual endeavour.

They often share their professional skills to support the community. An alliance usually referred to as a ‘strategic alliance’, is a close association of nations or other groups, formed to advance common interests or causes. These strategic partnerships seem to have blurred edges and though they are slightly different, they can all be used to describe some aspect of the Erasmus Mundus MA/Magistr in Special Education which was developed as a result of policy guidelines and funding from the European Commission.

Erasmus Mundus Attractiveness Projects
Under Action 3, Erasmus Mundus funds projects to enhance the attractiveness and visibility of European higher education worldwide. Activities focus on the international dimension of higher education, often targeting a particular region or academic discipline.

Funding is available for:
 European joint masters and doctorates
 Partnerships with non-European higher education institutions and scholarships for students and academics
 Projects to promote European higher education worldwide

See also
International Master of Science in Rural Development
 Masters in Strategic Project Management (European)
 University Mobility in Asia and the Pacific

References

External links
Erasmus Mundus website - European Commission
Erasmus Mundus website - Education Audiovisual and Culture Executive Agency
Erasmus Mundus Masters Courses
Erasmus Mundus Joint Masters scholarships
Erasmus Mundus Joint Doctorates
Erasmus Mundus Partnerships
Erasmus Mundus Attractiveness Projects
Erasmus Mundus Students and Alumni Association (EMA)
Erasmus Mundus Quality Assurance (EMQA)
Study in Europe/Fully Funded Scholarships

Educational policies and initiatives of the European Union
Erasmus Programme
Government scholarships